Eddie Santiago (born Eduardo Santiago Rodríguez, August 18, 1955) is a salsa singer from Puerto Rico.

Early years
At a young age, Santiago demonstrated great love for salsa music.  He performed with several groups, including Generación 2000, Orquesta La Potente, Orquesta Opus, and the Orquesta Saragüey.

Musical career
Santiago's career took off in 1986 in Puerto Rico and the rest of Latin America as a soloist, forming his own band, and recording songs including: "Tú me quemas" ("You Burn Me"), "Qué Locura Enamorarme de Ti" ("What Madness To Fall in Love With You"), "Me Fallaste" ("You Failed Me"), Antidoto y Veneno ("Antidote and Venom"), "Tu Me Haces Falta" ("I Miss You"), his best known hit "Lluvia" ("Rain", not to be confused with Menudo's hit of the same name), and many others. His fame eventually spread to Europe and the United States, making him one of the most popular salsa singers in the late 1980s and early 1990s. He was one of the main singers of "salsa romántica" ("romantic salsa").
 
His first major recording on an international label was with Sony Music in 1999. He also recorded for the TH, EMI Latin, and Polygram labels, including the well regarded production inspired by the music of Rafael Hernández, entitled Enamorado.

In 1999, he released Celebration: Epic Duets. He was joined on that album by other stars in the Latin music scene, Víctor Manuelle, Huey Dunbar and Elvis Crespo. The album was named one of the best recordings of 1999 by the National Foundation for Popular Culture.

Santiago has earned both gold and platinum records, along with other awards.

2004 to present
In 2004, Eddie Santiago announced a return to commercial music, with his new CD, Despues del Silencio (After the Silence), a title that alludes to the long period since his previous CD was released.

He was nominated for the Salsa/Merengue Album of the Year in the 2006 Grammy Awards.

His song "Black is Black" was included on the Nacho Libre movie soundtrack.

Discography
1986 - Atrevido y Diferente
1987 - Sigo Atrevido
1988 - Invasión de la Privacidad
1989 - New Wave Salsa
1990 - El Rey de la Salsa Romántica
1991 - Soy el Mismo
1993 - Intensamente
1993 - Cada Vez, Otra Vez
1995 - Eddie Santiago
1996 - De Vuelta a Casa
1997 - Enamorado
1999 - Celebracion: Epic Duets
2001 - Ahora
2004 - Interpreta los Grandes Éxitos de Luis Ángel
2004 - Después del Silencio
2006 - En Su Estilo... Romántico y Sensual

Charts

Albums

Singles

See also

List of Puerto Ricans

Notes

References

External links

Official MySpace page
Official IMDb page

1955 births
Living people
People from Toa Alta, Puerto Rico
20th-century Puerto Rican male singers
21st-century Puerto Rican male singers
Salsa musicians
Rodven Records artists